Alto Lucero (formally: Alto Lucero de Gutiérrez Barrios) is a city in the Mexican state of Veracruz. It serves as the administrative centre for the surrounding municipality of the same name. 

The Laguna Verde nuclear power plant, Mexico's only such facility, 
was built near the town of Punta Limón in Alto Lucero municipality during the 1970s.

External links
 Alto Lucero municipal webpage 
  Municipal Official Information
Photos with narrative of Alto Lucero, surroundings, and some wildlife

Populated places in Veracruz